The India Habitat Centre is a multipurpose building in the city of New Delhi, India. It was the brain child of the HuDCO Chairman, Santosh Sharma.

The India Habitat Centre is one of India's most comprehensive convention centers that is aimed at bringing individuals and institutions working in diverse habitat and environment related areas together.

Divided into five blocks which are connected with aerial walkaways, IHC can conduct up to 20 concurrent sessions from socio-cultural events and exhibitions to business and economic events. It has a Visual Art Gallery, Library and Resource Center, Learning Center, Amphitheater, Conference & Banquet Halls and Restaurants.

History and design
The India Habitat Centre was started in 1993. The public agency for Housing and Urban Development Corporation (HUDCO) wanted an office building for its workers and made the unprecedented decision to invite chosen nonprofit organizations that shared their concern with habitat to share that work space.

The chairman of HUDCO Santosh Sharma and the architect Joseph Allen Stein decided to radically change the traditional image of an office building as an architectural project and transformed it into an urban design project. The space was designed to permit the members of the centre to share services both inside and outside the building with multiple courtyards, common meeting rooms, shared parking area, library, restaurants, museum, and hotels, some of which are open to the general public. Constructed on nine acres in an urban area, the building eschewed traditional building materials and techniques.

Events and exhibitions 

Numerous events are held in the premises of the India Habitat Center. Various workshops are also conducted such as art, dance and film workshops. Photography exhibitions and talk are a popular feature in the center. Film screenings are also conducted such as those by Kriti Film Club which are open to for public.

In 2009, the India Habitat Centre co-hosted the inaugural Habitat Summit with Mirabilis Advisory and Urban Habitats Forum, a professional civil society initiative which aims "to serve as a multi-disciplinary public awareness and educational platform". Held in September, the event showcased community-oriented urban renewal projects.

In February 2020, IHC hosted a seven-day art exhibition Sculpt for Delhi III, presented by Delhi Art Society and organised by sculpture artist Neeraj Gupta. The exhibition featured works of 20 sculptors from across India.

Recurrent events

IHC hosted and organised the Delhi Photo Festival held every two years from 2011 to 2015. The partnership between India Habitat Centre (IHC) and Nazar Foundation (parent body of Delhi Photo Festival) was dissolved in early 2015 and Delhi Photo Festival 2015 was held at Indira Gandhi National Centre for the Arts (IGNCA).

The two-day fifth edition of Times LitFest is a major literary festival, organised by The Times of India and Rajnigandha, was held at the centre in 2019.  the festival's director is Vinita Dawra Nangia.

The Old World Theatre Festival, Delhi's oldest theatre festival, is held annually by the arts organisation Old World Culture at IHC. The 18th edition was held in 2019.

List of organisations
Sharing a common concern for habitat, the following organisations have come together to participate in institution-building, evolving a synergy within the India Habitat Centre complex.

Association of Indian Automobile Manufacturers
All India Brick & Tile Manufacturers Federation
All India Housing Development Association
Building Materials & Technology Promotion Council
Central Building Research Institute
Centre for Development Studies & Activities (CDSA)
Centre for Science & Environment
Centre for Science & Technology of the Non-Aligned & Other Developing Countries
Confederation of Indian Industry
Consultancy Development Centre
Council for Advancement of People's Action & Rural Technology
Council of Architecture
Delhi Art Society
Delhi Urban Art Commission
Foundation for Universal Responsibility of His Holiness The Dalai Lama
Indian Council for Research on International Economic Relations
Indian Renewable Energy Development Agency Ltd.
Indo-French Centre for the Promotion of Advanced Research
Infrastructure Leasing & Financial Services Ltd.
Institute of Social Studies Trust
International Labour Organisation
MacArthur Foundation
MCD Slum & JJ Department
National Foundation for India
National Capital Region - Planning Board
National Housing Bank
National Institute of Design
National Institute of Urban Affairs
Population Council
Research and Information System for the Non-Aligned & Other Developing Countries
Society for Development Studies
The Energy and Resources Institute
University of Pennsylvania Institute for the Advanced Study of India 
Vikram Sarabhai Foundation
Speco Engineering Pvt Ltd

Gallery

See also
Delhi Gymkhana
India International Centre

References

External links

 Official website
 Habitat World

1993 establishments in Delhi
Culture of Delhi
Buildings and structures in Delhi
Cultural infrastructure completed in 1993
Event venues established in 1993
Convention centres in India
Cultural centres in India
20th-century architecture in India